Youngn Lipz is an Australian- Samoan  hip-hop musician from Cabramatta, New South Wales.

Career

2019–2021: Career beginnings and Area Baby
In September 2019, Bronx rapper A Boogie wit da Hoodie toured Australia before releasing an official remix of his track "Mood Swings", featuring Youngn Lipz alongside two additional Australian rappers.

In October 2019, Youngn Lipz released his debut single "Misunderstood".

At the APRA Music Awards of 2021, "Misunderstood" won Most Performed Hip Hop / Rap Work. In July 2021, Youngn Lipz announced the release of his debut album Area Baby. The album was released on 6 August 2021.

2022: "Go!" 
On 11 February 2022, Youngn Lipz released "Go!", a song inspired by Calvin Harris and Avicii.

Discography

Albums

Singles

As lead artist

As featured artist

Other charted songs

Awards and nominations

APRA Awards
The APRA Awards are held in Australia and New Zealand by the Australasian Performing Right Association to recognise songwriting skills, sales and airplay performance by its members annually.

! 
|-
! scope="row" rowspan="1"| 2021
| "Misunderstood" 
| Most Performed Hip Hop / Rap Work
| 
| 
|-
! scope="row" rowspan="1"| 2022
| "How?" 
| Most Performed R&B / Soul Work
| 
| 
|}

ARIA Music Awards
The ARIA Music Awards is an annual ceremony presented by Australian Recording Industry Association (ARIA), which recognise excellence, innovation, and achievement across all genres of the music of Australia. They commenced in 1987.

! 
|-
| 2021|| Area Baby || ARIA Award for Best Hip Hop Release || 
| 
|-

References

Australian male rappers
Australian hip hop musicians
Australian people of Samoan descent
APRA Award winners
Living people
Rappers from Sydney
21st-century Australian male musicians
21st-century Australian musicians
Year of birth missing (living people)